Peter David Lax (born Lax Péter Dávid; 1 May 1926) is a Hungarian-born American mathematician and Abel Prize laureate working in the areas of pure and applied mathematics.

Lax has made important contributions to integrable systems, fluid dynamics and shock waves, solitonic physics, hyperbolic conservation laws, and mathematical and scientific computing, among other fields.

In a 1958 paper Lax stated a conjecture about matrix representations for third order hyperbolic polynomials which remained unproven for over four decades. Interest in the "Lax conjecture" grew as mathematicians working in several different areas recognized the importance of its implications in their field, until it was finally proven to be true in 2003.

Life and education
Lax was born in Budapest, Hungary to a Jewish family. Lax began displaying an interest in mathematics at age twelve, and soon his parents hired Rózsa Péter as a tutor for him. His parents Klara Kornfield and Henry Lax were both physicians and his uncle Albert Kornfeld (also known as Albert Korodi) was a mathematician, as well as a friend of Leó Szilárd.

The family left Hungary on 15 November 1941, and traveled via Lisbon to the United States. As a high school student at Stuyvesant High School, Lax took no math classes but did compete on the school math team. During this time, he met with John von Neumann, Richard Courant, and Paul Erdős, who introduced him to Albert Einstein.

As he was still 17 when he finished high school, he could avoid military service, and was able to study for three semesters at New York University. He attended a complex analysis class in the role of a student, but ended up taking over as instructor. He met his future wife, Anneli Cahn (married to her first husband at that time) in this class.

Before being able to complete his studies, Lax was drafted into the U.S. Army. After basic training, the Army sent him to Texas A&M University for more studies. He was then sent to Oak Ridge National Laboratory, and soon afterwards to the Manhattan Project at Los Alamos, New Mexico. At Los Alamos, he began working as a calculator operator, but eventually moved on to higher-level mathematics.

After the war ended, he remained with the Army at Los Alamos for another year, while taking courses at the University of New Mexico, then studied at Stanford University for a semester with Gábor Szegő and George Pólya.

Lax returned to NYU for the 1946–1947 academic year, and by pooling credits from the four universities at which he had studied, he graduated that year. He stayed at NYU for his graduate studies, marrying Anneli in 1948 and earning a PhD in 1949 under the supervision of Kurt O. Friedrichs.

Lax holds a faculty position in the Department of Mathematics, Courant Institute of Mathematical Sciences, New York University.

Awards and honors
He is a member of the Norwegian Academy of Science and Letters and the National Academy of Sciences, USA, the American Academy of Arts and Sciences, and the American Philosophical Society. He won a Lester R. Ford Award in 1966 and again in 1973. In 1974 his shock wave article also won the Chauvenet Prize. He was awarded the National Medal of Science in 1986, the Wolf Prize in 1987, the Abel Prize in 2005 and the Lomonosov Gold Medal in 2013. The American Mathematical Society selected him as its Gibbs Lecturer for 2007. In 2012 he became a fellow of the American Mathematical Society.

Lax is listed as an ISI highly cited researcher. According to György Marx he was one of The Martians.

Lax also received an Honorary Doctorate from Heriot-Watt University in 1990.

The CDC 6600 incident

In 1970, as part of an anti-war protest, the Transcendental Students took hostage a CDC 6600 super computer at NYU's Courant Institute which Lax had been instrumental in acquiring; the students demanded $100,000 in ransom to provide bail for a member of the Black Panthers. Some of the students present attempted to destroy the computer with incendiary devices, but Lax and colleagues managed to disable the devices and save the machine.

Books 

 Calculus with Applications and Computing, with S. Burstein and A. Lax, Springer-Verlag, New York (1979).
 Complex Proofs of Real Theorems, with Lawrence Zalcman, University Lecture Series, 2012; 90 pp; softcover, Volume: 58, 
 Decay of Solutions of Systems of Nonlinear Hyperbolic Conservation Laws, with J. Glimm, American Mathematical Society (1970).
  
 Functional Analysis, Wiley-Interscience, New York (2002)
 Hyperbolic Partial Differential Equations, American Mathematical Society/Courant Institute of Mathematical Sciences (2006).
 Hyperbolic Systems of Conservation Laws and the Mathematical Theory of Shock Waves, Society for Industrial Mathematics (1987).
 Linear Algebra and Its Applications, 2nd ed., Wiley-Interscience, New York (2007).
 Mathematical Aspects of Production and Distribution of Energy
 Nonlinear Partial Differential Equations in Applied Science
 Recent Advances in Partial Differential Equations
 Recent Mathematical Methods in Nonlinear Wave Propagation, with G. Boillat, C. M. Dafermos, T.-P. Liu, and T. Ruggeri, Springer (1996).
 Scattering Theory, with R. S. Phillips, Academic Press (1989), .
 Scattering Theory for Automorphic Functions with R. S. Phillips, Princeton Univ. Press (2001).

See also
Babuška–Lax–Milgram theorem
Lions–Lax–Milgram theorem
The Martians (scientists)

Notes

External links
2016 Video Interview with Peter Lax by Atomic Heritage Foundation Voices of the Manhattan Project
 

 Elements from his contributions to mathematics. Popularised presentation of Peter Lax by Helge Holden, published on the Abel Prize website.
 Abel Prize press release and biography

Living people
1926 births
Members of the United States National Academy of Sciences
Abel Prize laureates
20th-century American mathematicians
20th-century Hungarian mathematicians
21st-century American mathematicians
21st-century Hungarian mathematicians
Hungarian emigrants to the United States
American people of Hungarian-Jewish descent
Jews who emigrated to escape Nazism
Hungarian Jews
Members of the Norwegian Academy of Science and Letters
Foreign Members of the USSR Academy of Sciences
Foreign Members of the Russian Academy of Sciences
National Medal of Science laureates
Courant Institute of Mathematical Sciences alumni
Courant Institute of Mathematical Sciences faculty
Numerical analysts
Stuyvesant High School alumni
Wolf Prize in Mathematics laureates
Members of the French Academy of Sciences
Fluid dynamicists
Fellows of the American Mathematical Society
Fellows of the Society for Industrial and Applied Mathematics
Presidents of the American Mathematical Society
Recipients of the Lomonosov Gold Medal
PDE theorists
Textbook writers
Mathematicians from New York (state)
United States Army personnel of World War II
Members of the American Philosophical Society